Kantabanji is a Vidhan Sabha constituency of Balangir district, Odisha.

This constituency includes Kantabanji, Turekela block, Bangomunda block and Muribahal block.

In 2019, the Kantabanji Legislative Assembly Indian National Congress won by 128 votes. Since 2019 the, MLA from the Kantabanji Assembly Constituency is Santosh Singh Saluja INC, who won the seat in Odisha state assembly elections 2019, Previous MLAs from this seat were Haji Mohammad Ayyub Khanof the Biju Janata Dal, who won the seat in 2009 Odisha state assembly elections. Previous MLAs from this seat were independent candidate Haji Mohammad Ayub Khan in 2004, Prasanna Pal of JD in 1990, independent candidate Chaitanya Pradhan in 1985, Prasanna Kumar Pal representing INC (I) in 1980 and representing INC in 1977.

Kantabanji is part of Bolangir (Lok Sabha constituency).

Elected Members

Fourteen elections were held between 1961 and 2019.
Elected members from the Kantabanji constituency are:
2019: (70): Santosh Singh Saluja (Congress)
2014: (70): Ayub Khan (Biju Janata Dal) 
2009: (70): Santosh Singh Saluja (Congress) 
2004: (107): Haji Md. Ayub Khan (Independent) 
2000: (107): Santosh Singh Saluja (Congress)
1995: (107): Santosh Singh Saluja (Congress)
1990: (107): Prasanna Kumar Pal (Janata Dal)
1985: (107): Chaitanya Pradhan (Independent)
1980: (107): Prasanna Kumar Pal  (Congress-I)
1977: (107): Prasanna Kumar Pal (Congress)
1974: (107): Ramprasad Misra (Swatantra)
1971: (108): Achyutanand Mahanand (Swatantra)
1967: (108): Lokanath Rai (Swatantra)
1961: (41): Rajendra Narayan Singh Deo (Ganatantra Parishad)

2019 Election Result

2014 Election Result
In 2014 election, Biju Janata Dal candidate Ayub Khan defeated Indian National Congress candidate Santosh Singh Saluja by a margin of 3,868 votes.

Summary of results of the 2009 Election

Notes

References

Assembly constituencies of Odisha
Balangir district